Karl Kaimba Arantes (born 2 January 1990) is a Central African Republic footballer who plays as a defender for Montargis.

Career
In 2009, Kaimba signed for the reserves of Spanish La Liga side Deportivo La Coruña. In 2012, he signed for KM Tornhout in the Belgian third tier. In 2013, he signed for French club Montargis. In 2017, Kaimba returned to Montargis in the French fifth tier.

References

External links
 

Living people
1990 births
Central African Republic footballers
Association football defenders
Central African Republic international footballers
Championnat National 3 players
Deportivo Fabril players
Central African Republic expatriate footballers
Central African Republic expatriate sportspeople in Spain
Expatriate footballers in Spain
Central African Republic expatriate sportspeople in Belgium
Expatriate footballers in Belgium